Epsom and Ewell High School is a secondary school located at Ruxley Lane, Epsom, Surrey, England that opened in 1989. It is a coeducational, academy that educates children from ages 11–18, with over 900 on the roll. It is situated in the borough of Epsom and Ewell, in the outlying suburbs of London.

History
The school was formed in 1989 following the merger of Ewell High School and Epsom High School.

In 2008 the school was put in special measures following a critical Ofsted report. The school was again inspected in 2010 in which the outcome was very positive with Ofsted saying the school had gone from being in "Special Measures" to 'Good with outstanding features'. In September 2010 the school was designated as a specialist Language College.

In 2011, the school changed its House Names from famous historical people to Olympic athletes.
Keller, Edison, Picasso, Darwin and Luther King were replaced by Hoy, Redgrave, Thompson and Holmes.

Bourne Education Trust
In October 2011 Epsom and Ewell High School converted to academy status. The school is now part of the Bourne Education Trust, a Surrey-based multi-academy trust which includes Jubilee High School, Matthew Arnold School, Pyrcroft Grange Primary School, Sayes Court Primary School and Sythwood Primary School. Epsom and Ewell High School acts as the lead school of the trust.

As of September 2017, James Newman took over as Head of School, with Alex Russell acting as Executive Headteacher.

Hearing Resource Base
Epsom and Ewell High School is the only school in Surrey that has its own Hearing Resource Base, helping children with hearing difficulties or deafness. By 2020, Epsom and Ewell aim to increase the Hearing Resource Base (HRB) and bring in more funding for it.

Sixth Form
In 2016 Karen Davies took over the role as head of Sixth Form. In September 2016, 1 hour of enrichment was added to the students' timetable. This consists of teaching the Sixth Formers skills that wouldn't been taught inside of the classroom under a curriculum, such as applying for student finance and changing career paths.
The dress code for the Sixth Form was changed, prohibiting hoodies and jeans from being worn. This contributed to a turn around for the school's Sixth Form, allowing the students to look presentable.
A number of options are given to Year 12 and Year 13 students, including an Extended Project Qualification (EPQ). However, the head of Sixth Form is now Hannah Cobbold as of early 2019.

Sports Day Records
Sports Day Records as of July 2016

Key Staff Members
Executive Headteacher Alex Russell

Headteacher James Newman

Deputy Headteacher Chris Goodall

Assistant Headteacher Jessica Lobb

Assistant Headteacher Oli Daniel’s

Assistant Headteacher Nicola Heaney

Assistant Headteacher Aisleen Sheehan

Assistant Headteacher Claire Spain

Head of Sixth Form Hannah Cobbold

References

External links
Epsom and Ewell High School official website
Bourne Education Trust

Epsom
Academies in Surrey
Secondary schools in Surrey